Nasa asplundii is a species of plant in the Loasaceae family. It is endemic to Ecuador.  Its natural habitat is subtropical or tropical moist montane forests.

References

Endemic flora of Ecuador
asplundii
Vulnerable plants
Taxonomy articles created by Polbot